Hotel Poldruga zvezdica is a Slovenian television series.

Cast 
 Lara Jankovič
 Aleš Valič
 Uroš Fürst
 Janko Petrovec
 Aleksandra Balmazovič
 Jernej Kuntner
 Zvezdana Mlakar

External links
www.rtvslo.si

Slovenian television series
Radiotelevizija Slovenija original programming